René Ricardo Fujiwara Montelongo (born 7 April 1984) is a Mexican politician affiliated with the PANAL. As of 2013 he served as Deputy of the LXII Legislature of the Mexican Congress representing the Federal District. He is the grandson of Elba Esther Gordillo. He has a degree in philosophy from the University of Sussex.

References

1984 births
Living people
Politicians from Mexico City
New Alliance Party (Mexico) politicians
Mexican politicians of Japanese descent
Mexican people of Japanese descent
21st-century Mexican politicians
Alumni of the University of Sussex
Members of the Chamber of Deputies (Mexico) for Mexico City